Computer trespass is a computer crime in the United States involving unlawful access to computers. It is defined under the Computer Fraud and Abuse act. (U.S.C 18 § 1030)

Definition 
A computer trespass is defined as accessing a computer without proper authorization and gaining financial information, information from a department or agency from any protected computer. Each state has its own laws regarding computer trespassing but they all echo the federal act in some manner.

Examples of state legislation

New York
To be found guilty of computer trespass in New York one must knowingly use a computer, computer service, or computer network without authorization and commit (or attempt) some further crime.

Ohio 
(A) No person shall knowingly use or operate the property of another without the consent of the owner or person authorized to give consent.

(B) No person, in any manner and by any means, including, but not limited to, computer hacking, shall knowingly gain access to, attempt to gain access to, or cause access to be gained to any computer, computer system, computer network, cable service, cable system, telecommunications device, telecommunications service, or information service without the consent of, or beyond the scope of the express or implied consent of, the owner of the computer, computer system, computer network, cable service, cable system, telecommunications device, telecommunications service, or information service or other person authorized to give consent.

Punishment 
Under federal law, the punishment for committing a computer trespass is imprisonment for no more than 10 or 20 years, depending on the severity of the crime committed.                                (subsection (a) (b) (c) (1) (A) (B))

Criticism of the Computer Fraud and Abuse act 
Years after the CFAA was put into law, many have become uncomfortable with the law's language because of the drastic difference between today's technology and the technology of the 1980s. Legal scholars such as Orin Kerr and Tiffany Curtis have expressed such concerns. In one of Curtis's essays, "Computer Fraud and Abuse Act Enforcement: Cruel, Unusual, and Due for Reform." She expresses how, with the passage of time, the CFAA becomes a more cruel law with the current language used in the act. She then suggests that the United States Congress should take the act into review and refer it to the Eighth Amendment to update the language to better fit modern law and society. Kerr wrote in his essay, "Trespass, Not Fraud: The Need for New Sentencing Guidelines in CFAA Cases," that since the language is so vague in the act, you could be punished in a way that doesn't reflect the crime you committed. He stresses how the language stresses the financial fraud language more than any other part in the law, leaving the rest vague in meaning.

Notable computer breaches 

 2013 Yahoo! Data Breach
 2014 eBay Data Breach
 2013 Target Data breach
 2017 Equifax data breach

See also
 Computer Fraud and Abuse Act
 Computer security
 Cybercrime
 List of data breaches
 National Information Infrastructure Protection Act

References

Computer law